Gea is a genus of orb-weaver spiders first described by C. L. Koch in 1843.

Species
 it contains thirteen species:
Gea africana Simon, 1895 – Congo
Gea argiopides Strand, 1911 – New Guinea, Indonesia (Aru Is.)
Gea bituberculata (Thorell, 1881) – New Guinea
Gea eff Levi, 1983 – New Guinea, Papua New Guinea (New Britain)
Gea heptagon (Hentz, 1850) – Pacific Is., Australia. Introduced to USA to Argentina
Gea infuscata Tullgren, 1910 – East Africa, Angola
Gea nilotica Simon, 1906 – Sudan
Gea spinipes C. L. Koch, 1843 – India, China, Taiwan to Indonesia (Borneo)
Gea s. nigrifrons Simon, 1901 – Malaysia
Gea subarmata Thorell, 1890 – India, Bangladesh to Philippines, New Guinea
Gea theridioides (L. Koch, 1872) – Australia (Queensland, New South Wales)
Gea transversovittata Tullgren, 1910 – Congo, East Africa
Gea zaragosa Barrion & Litsinger, 1995 – India, Philippines

References

External links

Araneidae
Araneomorphae genera
Cosmopolitan spiders